The fifth season of the American television series The Flash, which is based on the DC Comics character Barry Allen / Flash, premiered on The CW on October 9, 2018, and concluded on May 14, 2019, with a total of 22 episodes. The season follows Barry dealing with the consequences of his future daughter's time traveling, while confronting a new foe in Orlin Dwyer, the Cicada. It is set in the Arrowverse, sharing continuity with the other television series of the universe, and is a spin-off of Arrow. The season was produced by Berlanti Productions, Warner Bros. Television, and DC Entertainment, with Todd Helbing serving as showrunner.

The season was ordered in April 2018, and production began that July. Grant Gustin stars as Barry, with principal cast members Candice Patton, Danielle Panabaker, Carlos Valdes, Tom Cavanagh, and Jesse L. Martin also returning from previous seasons, while Hartley Sawyer, Danielle Nicolet, and Jessica Parker Kennedy were promoted to series regulars from their recurring status in season four. They are joined by new cast member Chris Klein while former series regular Keiynan Lonsdale makes a guest appearance. The series was renewed for a sixth season on January 31, 2019.

Episodes

Cast and characters

Main 
 Grant Gustin as Barry Allen / Flash
 Candice Patton as Iris West-Allen
 Danielle Panabaker as Caitlin Snow / Killer Frost
 Carlos Valdes as Cisco Ramon / Vibe
 Hartley Sawyer as Ralph Dibny / Elongated Man
 Danielle Nicolet as Cecile Horton
 Jessica Parker Kennedy as Nora West-Allen / XS
 Chris Klein as Orlin Dwyer / Cicada
 Tom Cavanagh as Sherloque Wells and Eobard Thawne / Reverse-Flash
 Jesse L. Martin as Joe West

Recurring 

 Patrick Sabongui as David Singh 
 Lossen Chambers as Vanessa Ambres 
 Islie Hirvonen as Grace Gibbons 
 Sarah Carter as adult Grace Gibbons / Cicada II 
 Klarc Wilson as Officer "Jonesy" Jones  
 Victoria Park as Kamilla Hwang

Guest

Production

Development 
At the Television Critics Association winter press tour in January 2018, The CW president Mark Pedowitz said he was "optimistic" and "confident" about The Flash and the other Arrowverse shows returning next season, but added that it was too soon to announce anything just yet. On April 2, The CW renewed the series for its fifth season. Todd Helbing, who had previously served as a co-showrunner for the series' first four seasons, emerged as the series' first sole showrunner following Andrew Kreisberg's firing during the previous season.

Writing 
In October 2017, Kevin Smith revealed that then-executive producer Andrew Kreisberg already had plans for the next season of the show and had told him the story for The Flashs fifth season, which got Smith very excited and jokingly commenting, "I now have to stay alive one more year."

At San Diego Comic-Con 2018, Todd Helbing revealed that "legacy" would be a theme during the season, adding, "I think everybody's thinking about what it means after they leave." On the arrival of Barry and Iris' future daughter, Nora, Grant Gustin teased the different headspaces the characters would be in. "[Nora]’s kind of attached to [Barry] when she arrives and a little more distant with Iris," Gustin said. "It's a weird thing for Iris to see them bond so easily... obviously something happened in the future, which worries Iris," added Candice Patton. The season also sees Barry, Ralph, and Iris returning to their professional careers as a CSI, detective, and journalist, respectively. Patton noted that, "We live in such precarious times where we don't know what the truth is... I feel like [journalists] are superheroes... I hope that's a concept we bring to the show and give journalists the praise they deserve."

Helbing also revealed that there will be "a lot of deaths this season," and that the main antagonist would not be a speedster for the second season in a row. The new antagonist, Cicada, instead possesses powers that "present a challenge for Team Flash that they’ve never had to deal with before." He is not a cult leader as he is in the comics, but is portrayed as a "grizzled, blue-collar everyman whose family has been torn apart by metahumans" and who views the rise of metas as an epidemic, and seeks to exterminate them one by one.

Casting 
Main cast members Grant Gustin, Candice Patton, Danielle Panabaker, Carlos Valdes, and Jesse L. Martin return from previous seasons as Barry Allen / Flash, Iris West, Caitlin Snow / Killer Frost, Cisco Ramon / Vibe and Joe West, respectively. Tom Cavanagh also returned as a series regular, playing a new version of his character Harrison Wells, known as Sherloque Wells. Cavanagh also portrays Herr Wells of Earth-12 in the episode "The Death of Vibe", Harry Wells of Earth-2 in the episode "What's Past Is Prologue", and recurs as Eobard Thawne. The fifth season is the first not to feature Keiynan Lonsdale, who plays Wally West / Kid Flash, as a series regular since his introduction in the second season, following the character's move to Legends of Tomorrow during the previous season and Lonsdale's subsequent departure from that show as well. He appears only in the season premiere. In June 2018, Danielle Nicolet, Hartley Sawyer, and Jessica Parker Kennedy, who recurred during the previous season as Cecile Horton, Ralph Dibny / Elongated Man, and Nora West-Allen, respectively, were promoted to series regulars for the fifth season. Nicolet had additionally guest-starred at the end of the first season and had been recurring in the series since the third season. The season establishes that Nora's alias is XS, making her an amalgamation of Jenni Ognats / XS from DC Comics, and Barry and Iris' daughter in the comics, Dawn Allen. In July, Chris Klein also joined the main cast as Orlin Dwyer / Cicada, the season's main antagonist. Sarah Carter was cast to play an adult Grace Gibbons, who also adopts the Cicada persona.

Design 
The season introduces a new Flash suit, which Todd Helbing described as the series' most "accurate incarnation" of the Flash suit from the comics. The season also introduces Barry's "Flash ring" from the comics. The new suit adopts brighter colors than previous suits – which had maroon overtones – and, unlike prior incarnations, does not have a chin strap.

Filming 
Production for the season began on July 6, 2018, in Vancouver, British Columbia, and concluded on April 10, 2019. Danielle Panabaker made her directorial debut this season. Tom Cavanagh directed the eighth episode of the season, which served as the 100th episode of the series and led into the annual crossover. In October 2018, it was announced that Martin would take a medical leave from the series due to a back injury he sustained over the hiatus. Due to Martin's injury, the majority of his scenes in the first half of the season were shot depicting Joe seated. In January 2019, it was announced that Martin had returned from medical leave and that Joe would return in the fifteenth episode of the season.

Arrowverse tie-ins 
In May 2018, Arrow star Stephen Amell announced at The CW upfronts that the next Arrowverse crossover would feature Batwoman and Gotham City. The crossover "Elseworlds" has launched a 2019 solo series for the character.

Marketing 
The main cast of the season as well as executive producer Todd Helbing attended San Diego Comic-Con on July 21, 2018 to promote the season. Starting on September 14, 2018, several billboards advertising Ralph Dibny as a private investigator were seen around Vancouver, the city where the show is filmed.

Release

Broadcast 
The season premiered on The CW in the United States on October 9, 2018. The annual crossover episode swapped time-slots with Supergirl for that week and aired on Sunday, December 9.

Home media 
The season began streaming on Netflix in the United States on May 22, 2019. The season was released on DVD and Blu-ray on August 27, 2019.

Reception

Ratings 
{{Television episode ratings
| title     = The Flash season 5

| title1    = Nora
| date1     = October 9, 2018
| rs1       = 0.8/3
| viewers1  = 2.08
| dvr1      = 0.6
| dvrv1     = 1.73
| total1    = 1.4
| totalv1   = 3.80

| title2   = Blocked
| date2    = October 16, 2018
| rs2      = 0.7/3
| viewers2 = 1.69
| dvr2     = 0.6
| dvrv2    = 1.57
| total2   = 1.3
| totalv2  = 3.26

| title3   = The Death of Vibe
| date3    = October 23, 2018
| rs3      = 0.7/3
| viewers3 = 1.87
| dvr3     = 0.6
| dvrv3    = 1.52
| total3   = 1.3
| totalv3  = 3.39

| title4    = News Flash
| date4     = October 30, 2018
| rs4       = 0.7/3
| viewers4  = 1.75
| dvr4      = 0.5
| dvrv4     = 1.39
| total4    = 1.2
| totalv4   = 3.14

| title5    = All Doll'd Up
| date5     = November 13, 2018
| rs5       = 0.6/3
| viewers5  = 1.73
| dvr5      = 0.7
| dvrv5     = 1.50
| total5    = 1.3
| totalv5   = 3.23

| title6    = The Icicle Cometh
| date6     = November 20, 2018
| rs6       = 0.6/3
| viewers6  = 1.60
| dvr6      = 0.7
| dvrv6     = 1.67
| total6    = 1.3
| totalv6   = 3.27

| title7    = O Come, All Ye Thankful
| date7     = November 27, 2018
| rs7       = 0.6/3
| viewers7  = 1.79
| dvr7      = 0.6
| dvrv7     = 1.43
| total7    = 1.2
| totalv7   = 3.22

| title8    = What's Past Is Prologue
| date8     = December 4, 2018
| rs8       = 0.7/3
| viewers8  = 1.78
| dvr8      = 0.6
| dvrv8     = 1.45
| total8    = 1.3
| totalv8   = 3.23

| title9    = Elseworlds, Part 1
| date9     = December 9, 2018
| rs9       = 0.7/3
| viewers9  = 1.83
| dvr9      = 0.7
| dvrv9     = 1.68
| total9    = 1.4
| totalv9   = 3.51

| title10   = The Flash & the Furious
| date10    = January 15, 2019
| rs10      = 0.6/3
| viewers10 = 1.64
| dvr10     = 0.6
| dvrv10    = 1.65
| total10   = 1.2
| totalv10  = 3.29

| title11   = Seeing Red
| date11    = January 22, 2019
| rs11      = 0.7/3
| viewers11 = 1.88
| dvr11     = 0.6
| dvrv11    = 1.53
| total11   = 1.3
| totalv11  = 3.41

| title12   = Memorabilia
| date12    = January 29, 2019
| rs12      = 0.7/3
| viewers12 = 2.04
| dvr12     = 0.5
| dvrv12    = 1.32
| total12   = 1.2
| totalv12  = 3.36

| title13   = Goldfaced
| date13    = February 5, 2019
| rs13      = 0.7/3
| viewers13 = 1.89
| dvr13     = 0.6
| dvrv13    = 1.53
| total13   = 1.3
| totalv13  = 3.42

| title14   = Cause and XS
| date14    = February 12, 2019
| rs14      = 0.6/3
| viewers14 = 1.71
| dvr14     = 0.5
| dvrv14    = 1.33
| total14   = 1.1
| totalv14  = 3.04

| title15   = King Shark vs. Gorilla Grodd
| date15    = March 5, 2019
| rs15      = 0.6/3
| viewers15 = 1.67
| dvr15     = 0.5
| dvrv15    = 1.42
| total15   = 1.1
| totalv15  = 3.08

| title16   = Failure Is an Orphan
| date16    = March 12, 2019
| rs16      = 0.5/3
| viewers16 = 1.55
| dvr16     = 0.5
| dvrv16    = 1.27
| total16   = 1.0
| totalv16  = 2.82

| title17   = Time Bomb
| date17    = March 19, 2019
| rs17      = 0.5/3
| viewers17 = 1.64
| dvr17     = 0.5
| dvrv17    = 1.30
| total17   = 1.0
| totalv17  = 2.94

| title18   = Godspeed
| date18    = April 16, 2019
| rs18      = 0.5/2
| viewers18 = 1.31
| dvr18     = 0.5
| dvrv18    = 1.37
| total18   = 1.0
| totalv18  = 2.68

| title19   = Snow Pack
| date19    = April 23, 2019
| rs19      = 0.6/3
| viewers19 = 1.63
| dvr19     = 0.5
| dvrv19    = 1.21
| total19   = 1.1
| totalv19  = 2.84

| title20   = Gone Rogue
| date20    = April 30, 2019
| rs20      = 0.5/3
| viewers20 = 1.37
| dvr20     = 0.5
| dvrv20    = 1.25
| total20   = 1.0
| totalv20  = 2.62

| title21   = The Girl with the Red Lightning
| date21    = May 7, 2019
| rs21      = 0.5/3
| viewers21 = 1.45
| dvr21     = 0.5
| dvrv21    = 1.17
| total21   = 1.0
| totalv21  = 2.62

| title22   = Legacy
| date22    = May 14, 2019
| rs22      = 0.6/3
| viewers22 = 1.53
| dvr22     = 0.5
| dvrv22    = 1.16
| total22   = 1.1
| totalv22  = 2.69
}}

 Critical response 
The review aggregator website Rotten Tomatoes reported a 94% approval rating for the fifth season with an average rating of 7.73/10, based on 11 reviews. The website's consensus reads, "The Flashs fifth season maintains the show's high standard for compelling visuals, chilling villains, and well-scripted moments of humor, but also turns a more focused gaze on the role of family dynamics amongst the increasingly complex characters."

Reviewing for Den of Geek, Mike Cecchini gave the premiere a rating of 4.5/5. He called it "a genuinely special episode" and "an excellent return to form for the series", naming it the best season premiere in the show's history, while directing specific praise to Gustin, Kennedy, and the show's composer Blake Neely. IGNs Jesse Schedeen also praised the addition of Kennedy, but expressed concern over the introduction of yet another speedster character, "especially with certain existing characters continuing to be so poorly served". He gave the episode a rating of 7.4/10, adding, "in a lot of ways, things do seem to be looking up for The Flash. Unfortunately, there are plenty of other reminders that the series has chronic difficulties in juggling its ensemble cast." Chancellor Agard of Entertainment Weekly and Scott Von Doviak of The A.V. Club further praised Kennedy's performance, and gave the premiere a "B+" and "B" grade, respectively, with Agard concluding, "The Flash is now in its fifth season, which means the show's accumulated history is one of its greatest strengths it has. I'm glad it's finding both humorous fun and poignant ways to use it as we head towards the 100th episode."

Accolades

|-
! scope="row" rowspan="12" | 2019
| rowspan="2" | Kids' Choice Awards
| Favorite Male TV Star
| Grant Gustin
| 
| 
|-
| Favorite TV Drama
| The Flash| 
| 
|-
| BMI Film, TV & Visual Media Awards
| BMI Network Television Music Award
| data-sort-value="Blume, Nathaniel" | Nathaniel Blume and Blake Neely
| 
| 
|-
| rowspan="5" | Teen Choice Awards
| Choice TV Show: Action
| The Flash| 
| 
|-
| Choice TV Actor: Action
| Grant Gustin
| 
| 
|-
| rowspan="2" | Choice TV Actress: Action
| Candice Patton
| 
| 
|-
| Danielle Panabaker
| 
| 
|-
| Choice TV Villain
| Sarah Carter
| 
| 
|-
| rowspan="3" | Saturn Awards
| Best Superhero Television Series
| The Flash| 
| 
|-
| Best Actor on a Television Series
| Grant Gustin
| 
| 
|-
| Best Actress on a Television Series
| Candice Patton
| 
| 
|-
| People's Choice Awards
| The Sci-Fi/Fantasy Show of 2019
| The Flash''
| 
| 
|-
! scope="row" | 2020
| Leo Awards
| Best Visual Effects in a Dramatic Series
| data-sort-value="Kevorkian, Armen V."| Armen V. Kevorkian, Josh Spivack, Andranik Taranyan, Shirak Agresta, and Marc Lougee (for "King Shark vs. Gorilla Grodd")
| 
| 
|-
|}

Notes

References

General references

External links 
 
 

2018 American television seasons
2019 American television seasons
The Flash (2014 TV series) seasons